Manat, or Paynamar, is a divergent Madang language spoken in the Adelbert Range of Papua New Guinea.

Phonology

Vowels

References

Sogeram languages
Languages of Madang Province